Thimert-Gâtelles is a commune in the Eure-et-Loir department in northern France.

It was the site of a royal castle until 1058, when it was taken by the Normans. Between 1058 and 1060, it was besieged by the king of France. After that the castle was razed and a new castle built nearby, giving rise to Châteauneuf-en-Thymerais.

Population

See also
Communes of the Eure-et-Loir department

References

Communes of Eure-et-Loir